Jimbor may refer to several villages in Romania:

 Jimbor, a village in Chiochiș Commune, Bistriţa-Năsăud County
 Jimbor, a village in Homorod Commune, Braşov County